Rajesh Rishi (born 18 October 1964) is an Indian  politician and member of the Sixth Legislative Assembly of Delhi, India. He currently represents the Janakpuri constituency of Delhi and is a  member of the Aam Aadmi Party political party.

He is the former Parliamentary Secretary (Health) Government of NCT of Delhi. He is a sitting Member and Chair of the Standing Committees of Transport, IT, Tourism and Administrative Reforms in the Government of NCT of Delhi.

Early life and  education
Rajesh Rishi was born in Jalandhar on 18 October 1965. He attended Agra University and was awarded a Bachelor of Science degree in 1985.

Political  career
Rishi first contested an election in 2013. He was elected as a MLA in Delhi in 2015 for the Janakpuri constituency and is a member of the Aam Aadmi Party.

See also
 Politics of India

Electoral performance

References 

1964 births
Aam Aadmi Party politicians from Delhi
Delhi MLAs 2015–2020
Delhi MLAs 2020–2025
Living people